Mihovljan is a village and municipality in  Krapina-Zagorje County in Croatia. According to the 2011 census, the area has a population of 1,938, the absolute majority of whom are Croats.

References

Populated places in Krapina-Zagorje County
Municipalities of Croatia